The Niger women's national football team is the representative women's association football team of Niger. Its governing body is the Nigerien Football Federation (FENIFOOT) and it competes as a member of the Confederation of African Football (CAF).

The national team's first activity was in 2007, when they competed at the Tournoi de Cinq Nations held in Ouagadougou. On 2 September, they lost to Burkina Faso 0–10. Niger is currently ranked 164th in the FIFA Women's World Rankings.

Record per opponent
Key

The following table shows Niger' all-time official international record per opponent:

Results

2007

2018

2019

2020

2021

See also
 Niger national football team results

References

External links
 Niger results on The Roon Ba
 Niger results on Globalsports
 Niger results on worldfootball.net

2010s in Niger
2020s in Niger
Women's national association football team results